A constitutional referendum was held in Liberia on 4 May 1943, alongside general elections. The changes to the constitution required the president to be a Liberian citizen by birth or to have lived in Liberia for at least 25 years, as well as allowing constitutional referendums to be held separately from general elections. The changes were approved by voters.

Constitutional change
The proposed changes would be to Chapters III and V.

A two-thirds majority in the vote was necessary for the changes to be approved.

References

1943 referendums
1943 in Liberia
Referendums in Liberia
Constitutional referendums in Liberia
May 1943 events